Ivanora Gora is a village in Ostashkovsky District of Tver Oblast, Russia.

References

Rural localities in Ostashkovsky District